The 2022–23 Hawaii Rainbow Warriors men's basketball team represents the University of Hawaiʻi at Mānoa during the 2022–23 NCAA Division I men's basketball season. The Rainbow Warriors, led by Eran Ganot in his eighth season, play their games at SimpliFi Arena at Stan Sheriff Center as a member of the Big West Conference.

Previous season 

The Rainbow Warriors finished the 2021–22 season 17–11, 10–5 in Big West play to finish in third place. They defeated UC Riverside in the quarterfinals of the Big West tournament before losing to Cal State Fullerton in the semifinals.

Roster

Schedule 

|-
!colspan=9 style=| Regular season

|-
!colspan=9 style=| Big West regular season

|-
!colspan=12 style=| Big West tournament

References 

Hawaii Rainbow Warriors basketball seasons
2022–23 Big West Conference men's basketball season
2022 in sports in Hawaii
2023 in sports in Hawaii